Chondrilla is a genus of flowering plants in the family Asteraceae. They are native to Eurasia, and certain taxa are known as introduced species outside their native range. The best known of these is rush skeletonweed (Chondrilla juncea), a noxious weed established in Africa, Australia, and the Americas.

Chondrilla species produce one or more stems up to 1.5 meters tall from a taproot which can be very deep and highly branched. The basal and lower stem leaves are divided and toothed, and are borne on winged petioles. The upper leaf blades are smaller and simple. The cylindrical flower heads are often solitary but may grow in clusters, and are located along the branches and at the ends. They contain several yellow florets that soon wither. The fruit is a cylindrical, beaked, ribbed cypsela with a pappus of many white bristles.

This genus is closely related to the dandelions of genus Taraxacum. Plants of both genera undergo apomixis, producing fertile seeds via asexual reproduction.

Confusingly, the name Chondrilla is shared by a genus of Demosponge.

 Species

References

Asteraceae genera
Cichorieae